Hudson is a town in Lincoln County, South Dakota, United States. The population was 311 at the 2020 census. It is the easternmost community in South Dakota.

The town takes its name from Hudson, Iowa, the native home of a large share of the early settlers.

Geography
Hudson is located at  (43.129824, -96.454627), along the Big Sioux River.

Hudson has been assigned the ZIP code 57034 and the FIPS place code 30740.

Demographics

2010 census
As of the census of 2010, there were 296 people, 126 households, and 70 families residing in the town. The racial makeup of the town was 98.3% White, 1.0% Native American, and 0.7% from two or more races.

There were 126 households, of which 19.8% had children under the age of 18 living with them, 49.2% were married couples living together, 4.0% had a female householder with no husband present, 2.4% had a male householder with no wife present, and 44.4% were non-families. 37.3% of all households were made up of individuals, and 20.6% had someone living alone who was 65 years of age or older. The average household size was 2.07 and the average family size was 2.74.

The median age in the town was 47.7 years. 13.5% of residents were under the age of 18; 9.8% were between the ages of 18 and 24; 21% were from 25 to 44; 28.7% were from 45 to 64; and 27% were 65 years of age or older. The gender makeup of the town was 53.7% male and 46.3% female.

2000 census
As of the census of 2000, there were 402 people, 146 households, and 93 families residing in the town. The population density was 1,505.5 people per square mile (574.9/km2). There were 162 housing units at an average density of 606.7 per square mile (231.7/km2). The racial makeup of the town was 98.01% White, 1.49% Native American, and 0.50% from two or more races. Hispanic or Latino of any race were 1.00% of the population.

There were 146 households, out of which 33.6% had children under the age of 18 living with them, 56.2% were married couples living together, 6.8% had a female householder with no husband present, and 36.3% were non-families. 29.5% of all households were made up of individuals, and 17.1% had someone living alone who was 65 years of age or older. The average household size was 2.56 and the average family size was 3.22.

In the town, the population was spread out, with 29.9% under the age of 18, 6.0% from 18 to 24, 25.6% from 25 to 44, 19.7% from 45 to 64, and 18.9% who were 65 years of age or older. The median age was 37 years. For every 100 females, there were 87.9 males. For every 100 females age 18 and over, there were 89.3 males.

The median income for a household in the town was $36,250, and the median income for a family was $44,792. Males had a median income of $30,469 versus $21,607 for females. The per capita income for the town was $16,339. About 1.9% of families and 4.0% of the population were below the poverty line, including 2.3% of those under age 18 and 4.3% of those age 65 or over.

Education
Alcester-Hudson High School is the only high school in the Alcester-Hudson School District.

References

Towns in Lincoln County, South Dakota
Towns in South Dakota
Sioux Falls, South Dakota metropolitan area